This is a list of events in South African sport in 2005.

Athletics
 23–31 August - South Africa wins 4 medals at the 2003 World Championships in Athletics held at the Stade de France in Saint Denis, Paris, France: Jacques Freitag and Hestrie Cloete - golds in the High jump; Okkert Brits - silver in the Pole vault and Mbulaeni Mulaudzi - bronze in the 800 m
 13–14 September - Hestrie Cloete (High jump) and  Okkert Brits (pole vault) win a gold and silver respectively at the 1st IAAF World Athletics Final held at the Stade Louis II, in Monte Carlo, Monaco

Football (Soccer)
 11 October - South Africa (Bafana Bafana) beats Costa Rica 2-1 in the Nelson Mandela Challenge held in Potchefstroom

See also
2002 in South African sport
2003 in South Africa
2004 in South African sport
List of years in South African sport

 
South Africa